Tom De Koning (born 16 July 1999) is a professional Australian rules footballer playing for Carlton in the Australian Football League (AFL).

De Koning attended Padua College and played junior football for Mt Martha with current teammate Jacob Weitering and St Kilda player Hunter Clark. He typically played as a ruckman. De Koning joined TAC Cup club Dandenong Stingrays and kicked nine goals in 2016 as a 17-year-old against the Northern Knights. He joined the AFL Academy, played 11 TAC Cup games and kicked 17 goals. De Koning lacerated his kidney in July 2017 after a fall in a ruck contest, but recovered and was drafted by Carlton with pick 30 in the 2017 AFL national draft. In 2018, De Koning extended his contract until 2021, and made his AFL debut in round 22 against the Western Bulldogs at Docklands Stadium. He recorded 11 disposals, five marks and kicked his first goal in the second quarter.

De Koning is the son of former Footscray player Terry De Koning and has nine siblings, including  footballer Sam De Koning. His Dutch grandfather Martin was a migrant to Australia.

References

External links 

Living people
1999 births
Australian people of Dutch descent
Dandenong Stingrays players
Carlton Football Club players
Preston Football Club (VFA) players
People educated at Padua College (Melbourne)
Australian rules footballers from Victoria (Australia)